Turritella torulosa is a species of sea snail, a marine gastropod mollusk in the family Turritellidae.

Description

Distribution

References

 Vine, P. (1986). Red Sea Invertebrates. Immel Publishing, London. 224 pp.
 mythe, K. R. (1982). Seashells of the Arabian Gulf. George Allen & Unwin, London. 123: pp., 20 pls

External links
 Kiener, L.C. (1838). Spécies général et iconographie des coquilles vivantes. Vol. 10. Famille des Turbinacées. Genre Turritelle (Turritella, Lam.), pp. 1–46, pl. 1–14 [pp. 1–46 (1844), pl. 1–3, 5, 7–14 (1843), 4, 6 (1844)]; Scalaire (Scalaria, Lam.), pp. 1–22, pl. 1–7 [all (1838)]; Cadran (Solarium,Lam.), pp. 1–12, pl. 1–4 [all (1838)]; Roulette (Rotella, Lam.), pp. 1–10, pl. 1–3 [all (1838)]; Dauphinule (Dephinula, Lam.), pp. 1–12, pl. 1–4 [pp. 1–10 (1838), 11–12 (1842); pl. 1 (1837), 2–4 (1838]; Phasianelle (Phasianella, Lam.), pp. 1–11, pl. 1–5 [pp. 1–11 (1850); pl. 1–3, 5 (1847), 4 (1848)]; Famille des Plicacées de Lamarck, et des Trochoides de Cuvier. Genre Tornatelle (Tornatella, Lamarck), pp. 3–6, pl. 1 [all (1834)]; Genre Pyramidelle (Pyramidella), Lamarck, pp. 1–8, pl. 1–2 [all (1835)]; [Famille des Myacées.] Genre Thracie (Thracia, Leach), pp. 1–7, pl. 1–2
 Reeve, L.A. (1849). Monograph of the genus Turritella. In: Conchologia Iconica. vol. 5, pl. 1–11 and unpaginated text. L. Reeve & Co., London.
 Smith, E. A. (1913) On the Pennant collection of British shells. Journal of Conchology, 14: 38–41
 Pennant, T. (1777). British Zoology, vol. IV. Crustacea. Mollusca. Testacea. London. i–viii, 1–154, Plates 1–93
 Pennant, Thomas. (1812). British Zoology. A new edition in four volumes. vol IV. Class V. Crustacea. Class VI. Vermes. Wilkie & Robinson. London. xvi+379 pp. 95 pls

Turritellidae
Gastropods described in 1843